Chiaho Shih (born 9 January 1950) is a Distinguished Research Fellow in the Division of Infectious Disease & Immunology, Institute of Biomedical Sciences, Academia Sinica in Taiwan. His research is in the area of Molecular virology, Viral hepatitis and Hepatoma, and Cancer.

He is best known for his discovery of the first human oncogene Ras in 1982 while as a graduate student in the lab of Robert Weinberg at MIT, which is partially documented in Natalie Angier's book Natural Obsessions, about her year spent in Weinberg's lab. Also, the discovery is documented in Siddhartha Mukherjee's book The Emperor of All Maladies: A Biography of Cancer.

Shih was previously a professor at the University of Texas Medical Branch and the University of Pennsylvania.

Further reading

References

Taiwanese virologists
Cancer researchers
Taiwanese immunologists
Academia Sinica
1950 births
Living people
University of Texas Medical Branch faculty
University of Pennsylvania faculty
Massachusetts Institute of Technology alumni